Melvin A. Dorta (born January 15, 1982 in Valencia, Venezuela) is a retired professional baseball infielder. Dorta bats and throws right-handed. He made his Major League Baseball debut with the Washington Nationals on Sept 1, 2006.

Career

Boston Red Sox
Dorta began his career by joining the Boston Red Sox organization in 2001. He was assigned to the GCL Red Sox and also appeared for the Augusta GreenJackets. In 2002, he played for the advanced A-ball Sarasota Red Sox, with whom he spent the entire 2002 and 2003 seasons.

Montreal Expos/Washington Nationals
Dorta, who has played every position in the field except pitcher, was acquired by the Montreal Expos from the Boston Red Sox on January 5, . In 2004 he played for the AA Harrisburg Senators and remained in Harrisburg in 2005 when Montreal became Washington. In , Dorta established career highs with 11 home runs, 50 RBI and 121 games played for Double-A Harrisburg Senators. In , he was selected for the Eastern League All-Star Game and was promoted to Washington. At the time of his promotion, he was batting .277 with 15 doubles, three triples, four home runs and 24 RBI in 85 games. He left Harrisburg ranking fourth in the league with an organization-best and a career-high 25 stolen bases. Dorta rejoined the Senators after two games with Washington, where he was 0-for-1 as a pinch-hitter and was caught stealing as a pinch-runner. In 2007, Dorta did not appear in the major leagues, and played for Harrisburg and the AAA Columbus Clippers. He became a free agent after the season.

Pittsburgh Pirates
On January 24, Dorta signed a minor league contract with an invitation to spring training with the Pittsburgh Pirates. He spent the season with the Altoona Curve, the Double-A affiliate of Pittsburgh. He became a free agent at the end of the season.

Baltimore Orioles
Dorta signed a minor league contract with the Baltimore Orioles in December 2008. Dorta was assigned to the Double-A Bowie Baysox to begin the season. On May 16, he was promoted to the Triple-A Norfolk Tides. He would play in 94 games for Norfolk, hitting .252/.301/.321. On November 9, 2009, he elected free agency.

Philadelphia Phillies
On March 1, 2010, Dorta signed a minor league deal with the Philadelphia Phillies organization. He was assigned to the Double-A Reading Phillies to begin the season. On April 15, he was promoted to the Triple-A Lehigh Valley IronPigs. Dorta played in 103 games for the Phillies organization before he elected free agency on November 6, 2010.

Camden Riversharks
Dorta signed with the Camden Riversharks of the Atlantic League of Professional Baseball for the 2011 season. He played in 8 games for Camden, hitting .097/.125/.129 before he was released.

Road Warriors
Shortly after his release, Dorta signed with the Road Warriors of the Atlantic League. He played in 39 games for the club, batting .353/.373/.433 for the team. He became a free agent at the conclusion of the season.

Second Stint with Washington Nationals
On March 4, 2013, Dorta signed a minor league deal with the Washington Nationals organization. He was injured before the season started and made no appearances for a minor league affiliate or the major league club. He elected free agency on November 4, 2013, but resigned on a minor league contract on November 14. He was released by the team before the start of the 2014 season.

In 2013, he became an assistant coach for the Harrisburg Senators.

See also
 List of Major League Baseball players from Venezuela

External links

Versality stokes Dorta's career
Yahoo! Sports

1982 births
Altoona Curve players
Atlantic League Road Warriors players
Augusta GreenJackets players
Camden Riversharks players
Columbus Clippers players
Gulf Coast Red Sox players
Harrisburg Senators players
Washington Nationals players
Living people
Major League Baseball infielders
Major League Baseball players from Venezuela
New Orleans Zephyrs players
Sarasota Red Sox players
Sportspeople from Valencia, Venezuela
Venezuelan expatriate baseball players in the United States